Amy Feng (born Jun Feng, 9 April 1969) is a Chinese-born table tennis player who represented the United States at the 1996 Summer Olympics.

References

1969 births
Living people
Table tennis players from Tianjin
American female table tennis players
Chinese female table tennis players
Table tennis players at the 1996 Summer Olympics
Olympic table tennis players of the United States
Chinese emigrants to the United States
Pan American Games gold medalists for the United States
Pan American Games medalists in table tennis
Naturalised table tennis players
Table tennis players at the 1999 Pan American Games
Medalists at the 1999 Pan American Games
21st-century American women